The Railway Man may refer to:

 The Railway Man (book), an autobiography by Eric Lomax, published in 1995
 The Railway Man (film), a film adaptation of the book, starring Colin Firth and Nicole Kidman

See also
 The Railwaymen (disambiguation), nickname of two English football clubs